Shortt Gap is an unincorporated community in  Buchanan County, Virginia, United States. Shortt Gap is located along U.S. Route 460 northwest of Richlands. Shortt Gap has a post office with ZIP code 24647.

References

Unincorporated communities in Buchanan County, Virginia
Unincorporated communities in Virginia